Monarch Mountain is a  mountain located in the Victoria Cross Ranges of Jasper National Park in Alberta, Canada. Its name comes from an unknown source. Precipitation runoff from the mountain drains into tributaries of the Miette River and Snaring River, which in turn are both tributaries of the Athabasca River.


Climate
Based on the Köppen climate classification, the mountain is located in a subarctic climate zone with cold, snowy winters, and mild summers. Winter temperatures can drop below −20 °C with wind chill factors below −30 °C. The months July through September offer the most favorable weather to climb.

Geology
The mountain is composed of sedimentary rock laid down during the Precambrian to Jurassic periods and pushed east and over the top of younger rock during the Laramide orogeny.

See also
 List of mountains in the Canadian Rockies
 Geography of Alberta

References

Two-thousanders of Alberta
Alberta's Rockies
Mountains of Jasper National Park